Andrew is the English form of the given name, common in many countries. In the King James Bible, the Greek "Ἀνδρέας" is translated as Andrew.

Popularity 
In the 1990s, it was among the top ten most popular names given to boys in English-speaking countries.

Australia 
In 2000, the name Andrew was the second most popular name in Australia. In 1999, it was the 19th most common name, while in 1940, it was the 31st most common name. Andrew was the first most popular name given to boys in the Northern Territory in 2003 to 2015 and continuing. In Victoria, Andrew was the first most popular name for a boy in the 1970s.

Canada 
Andrew was the 20th most popular name chosen for male infants in 2005.
Andrew was the 16th most popular name for infants in British Columbia in 2004, the 17th most popular name in 2003, and the 19th most popular name in 2002. In 2001, it was the 18th most common name. From 1999 to 2003, Andrew was the sixth most often chosen name for a boy.

Europe 
In the United Kingdom in 1974, Andrew was the fourth-most common name given to baby boys, and it was third in 1964. In Scotland, Andrew was the most popular name given to baby boys in 1993, with 1,099 boys given the name that year.

In Norway, with the spelling 'Andreas', the name has been the second-most common name given to boys of the 1990s.

United States 
The eleventh most common baby name in 2006, Andrew was among the ten most popular names for male infants in 2005. Andrew was the sixth most popular choice for a male infant in 2004. In 2002 and 2001, Andrew was the seventh most popular baby name in the United States. In the 1980s, Andrew was the 19th most popular choice of baby name in the United States. In the 1970s it was the 31st most popular name. From the 1960s stretching back at least as far as the 1880s, Andrew was not among the forty most popular names in America.

Variants by language 
 Anaru: Māori, masculine
 Andria: Georgian, masculine
 Aindrea, Aindreas or Anndra: Scottish Gaelic, masculine
 Aindréas, Aindriú, Aindreas: Irish Gaelic, masculine
 Anaru: Maori, masculine
 Andra: Scots, masculine
 Ander:  Basque, masculine
 Änder:  Luxembourgish
 Anders: Danish, Finnish, German, Norwegian, Swedish
 Andrìa: Sardinian
 Andras: Welsh
 András, Endre: Hungarian, masculine
 Andraš: Prekmurje dialect of Slovene, masculine
 Andraž: Slovene, masculine
 André: French, English, Latin, Catalan, Luxembourgish, Dutch, Estonian, Romanian, German, Canadian, Hungarian, Danish, Swedish, Corsican, Icelandic, Czech, Slovak, Slovenian, Polish and Portuguese, masculine
 Andrea: Albanian, Italian, Latin, masculine; Croatian, Czech, Danish, Dutch, English, Finnish, French, Galician, German, Hungarian, Icelandic, Italian (only recently), Macedonian, Norwegian, Polish, Romanian, Slovak, Slovenian, Spanish, Swedish, feminine
 Andréa : French, Portuguese
 Andréanne : French, feminine
 Andréane : French
 Andréana : Malgasy
 Andreas: Armenian, Cypriot Greek, Danish, German, Greek, Norwegian, Icelandic, Swedish, Welsh, masculine
 Andros: Greek, masculine
 Andreu: Catalan, masculine
 Andreea: Romanian, feminine
 Andrée: French, feminine
 Marie-Andrée, Anne-Andrée, Andrée-Anne, Andrée-Marie,French, feminine

 Andrees: Older Dutch and seldom used Afrikaans, masculine
 Andrei: Moldovan, Romanian, Belarusian, Russian, masculine
 Andréia: Portuguese, feminine
 Andreina: Italian, feminine
 Andris, Andrejs, Andis: Latvian, masculine
 Andrej: Belarusian, Croatian, Macedonian, Serbian, Slovak, Slovene, masculine
 Andrey: Russian and Bulgarian, masculine (Cyrillic and thus often alternatively transliterated as Andrei for both)
 Andreja: Macedonian, masculine; Croatian, Slovene, feminine
 Andres: Estonian, masculine
 Andrés: Icelandic, Spanish, masculine
 Andressa: Portuguese, feminine
 Andreu: Catalan, masculine
 Andreus: Latin, masculine
 Andrew: English, masculine
 Andrėja: Lithuanian, feminine
 Andrėjus: Lithuanian, Masculine
 , : Georgian, masculine
 Andri: Icelandic, masculine
 , : Georgian, masculine
 Andric: English, masculine
 Andries: Dutch and Afrikaans, masculine
 Andrii: Ukrainian, masculine
 Andrija: Croatian and Serbian, masculine
 Andrijana: Macedonian, Serbian, feminine
 Andis, Andris, Andrejs, Anžejs or Andžejs: Latvian, masculine
 Andrius: Lithuanian, masculine
 Andriy: Ukrainian, masculine
 Andrzej or Jędrzej: Polish, masculine
 Andrzeja: Polish, feminine; obsolete
 Aneterea: Samoan, masculine
 Anintelu: Tongan, masculine
 Antti: Finnish, masculine
 Ondřej: Czech, masculine
 Ondrej or Andrej: Slovak, masculine
 Andrij: Ukrainian, masculine
 Indrì or Andrija: Maltese, masculine
 Andis, Andijs or Endijs: Latvian, masculine
 Andrea, Andreu, André, Ndré, Ndreu, Andër, Andërs: Albanian, masculine
 : Malayalam, masculine
 : Telugu, masculine
 : Korean, masculine
 : Japanese, masculine
 : Mandarin Chinese (simplified), masculine
 : Mandarin Chinese (traditional), masculine
 : Amharic, masculine
 اندرآي (Romanized: Andrai): Ziyadi, masculine

Surname 
Anderson 
Andrews

People named Andrew 

 List of people with given name Andrew
 Andrew (surname), including a list of people with surname Andrew

See also
 
 
 
 Andy (given name)
 Andre (disambiguation)
 Andrea
 Andreas
 Andreou
 Andrey
 Andrew (surname)
 Anderson (surname)

References 

English masculine given names
Given names of Greek language origin